Cees Jan Diepeveen (born July 24, 1956 in Amsterdam, North Holland) is a former field hockey player from the Netherlands, who participated in three Summer Olympics: in Los Angeles (1984), in Seoul (1988) and finally in Barcelona (1992). In 1988 he was a member of the team that won the bronze medal in South Korea, after defeating Australia (2-1) in the Bronze Medal Game.

External links
 
  
 
 

1956 births
Living people
Dutch male field hockey players
Dutch field hockey coaches
Olympic field hockey players of the Netherlands
Olympic bronze medalists for the Netherlands
Field hockey players at the 1984 Summer Olympics
Field hockey players at the 1988 Summer Olympics
Field hockey players at the 1992 Summer Olympics
Field hockey players from Amsterdam
Olympic medalists in field hockey
Medalists at the 1988 Summer Olympics
HC Bloemendaal players
1990 Men's Hockey World Cup players
20th-century Dutch people
21st-century Dutch people